Bachelor of Business Information Systems (BBIS) is an IT focused undergraduate program designed to better understand the needs of business and industry and be well equipped to meet those needs. It blends core concepts from a traditional business administration degree and a technology related degree.

International variations

Australia
It is offered by Asia Pacific International College (APIC), Kent Institute Australia,  Swinburne University of Technology, RMIT University, La Trobe University, Melbourne Institute of Technology, Monash University, Open Universities Australia, Sydney International School of Technology and Commerce  and Torrens University Australia.
In Australia, it is a 3-years program.

Germany 
Furtwangen University of Applied Sciences in Germany offers International Business Information Systems a leading bachelor study program in Germany educating students in three fields of competence: Applied Computer Science, Digital Business Management and Data Science & Artificial Intelligence.

India
In India, it is known as Bachelor of Science (Business Information System) which is offered by Hindustan Institute of Technology and Management and FTMS Global Academy India Private Limited.

Nepal
BBIS program is offered by Kathmandu University under the Department of Management Informatics and Communication, School of Management and Little Angels College of Management (LACM). LACM is affiliated to Kathmandu University.

It is a 4 years - 141 credit hours comprehensive bachelor degree program, designed by blending the domain knowledge of the information systems and information technology with that of business and management.

Singapore
Murdoch University offers Bachelor of Science in Business Information Systems in Singapore.

United States
Ashford University offers online course in Bachelor of Arts in Business Information Systems.

Scope and career prospects
A typical role for BBIS graduates is systems analyst, where the graduates can apply their expertise in analyzing business information system requirements and system deployment methods. This program prepares for the graduates to be the Information Systems professionals and they can  work as a Database Administrator (DBA), Chief Information Officer (CIO) and other senior management positions with additional work experience and professional development.

They can also work as Business Analyst, IT Project Manager, IT Consultant, IT Technical Support Officer, Programmer and Designer, Applications Developer, Network Administrator, Computer Engineer, Computer System Auditor, Computer System Engineer, Data Modeller, Database Designer and Administrator, Electronic Commerce Administrator, Hardware Technician, Business Process Analyst, Enterprise System Analyst, Information and Data Manager, Information Management Administrator, Information Manager, Management Consultant, Sales Representative, Specialist Consultant, System Designer, Training and Support Leader and Training Manager.

See also
 Kathmandu University
 Bachelor of Business Administration

References

Business Information Systems, Bachelor of